Spiritism (French: spiritisme; Portuguese: espiritismo) is a spiritualist, religious, and philosophical doctrine established in France in the 1850s by the French teacher, educational writer, and translator Hippolyte Léon Denizard Rivail. He wrote books on "the nature, origin, and destiny of spirits, and their relation with the corporeal world" under Allan Kardec.

Kardec's works result from studying mediumistic phenomena, which he initially believed fraudulent. While questioning several mediums, while they were in a trance state, on various matters, he compiled, compared, and synthesized the answers obtained from spirits into a body of knowledge known as codification. It speaks of the constant need to investigate the world around us (science), to make sense of our findings (philosophy), and to apply them to our day-to-day living to improve ourselves and the world around us (religion). This approach is often called the triple aspect of Spiritism: the conjoining of Science, Philosophy, and Religion.

Spiritist philosophy postulates that humans and all other living beings are immortal spirits that temporarily inhabit physical bodies for several necessary incarnations to attain moral and intellectual improvement. It also asserts that disembodied spirits may have a beneficent or malevolent influence on the physical world through passive or active mediumship. Spiritism also embraces the concepts of theistic evolution.

The term first appeared in Kardec's book, The Spirits Book, which sought to distinguish Spiritism from spiritualism.

Spiritism is currently represented in 35 countries by the International Spiritist Council. It has influenced a social movement of healing centres, charity institutions and hospitals involving millions of people in dozens of countries. The most significant number of adherents are in Brazil.
Spiritism is a substantial component of the syncretic Afro-Brazilian religion Umbanda and also very influential in Cao Đài, a Vietnamese religion started in 1926 by three mediums who claimed to have received messages that identified Allan Kardec as a prophet of a new universal religion.

Origins

Spiritism is based on the five books of the Spiritist Codification written by French educator Hypolite Léon Denizard Rivail under the pseudonym Allan Kardec, in which he reported observations of phenomena at séances that he attributed to incorporeal intelligence (spirits). His works were later extended by writers such as Léon Denis, Gabriel Delanne, Arthur Conan Doyle, Ernesto Bozzano, Gustav Geley, Chico Xavier, Divaldo Pereira Franco, Emídio Brasileiro, Alexandr Aksakov, William Crookes, Oliver Lodge, Albert de Rochas, and Amalia Domingo Soler. Kardec's research was influenced by the Fox sisters and the use of talking boards. Interest in Mesmerism also contributed to early Spiritism.

Swedenborg
Emanuel Swedenborg (January 29, 1688 – March 29, 1772) was a Swedish Lutheran scientist, philosopher, seer, and theologian. Swedenborg had a prolific career as an inventor and scientist.

At 56, he claimed to have experienced visions of the spiritual world and talked with angels, devils, and spirits by visiting heaven and hell. He claimed the Lord Jesus Christ directed him to reveal the doctrines of his Second Coming.

Swedenborg, however, warned against seeking contact with spirits. In his work Apocalypse Explained, #1182.4, he wrote, "Many persons believe that man can be taught by the Lord using spirits speaking with him. But those who believe this and desire to do so are unaware that it is associated with danger to their souls." See also Heaven and Hell #249.

Nevertheless, Spiritists often cite Swedenborg as a significant precursor of their beliefs.

Fox sisters

Sisters Leah (1814–90), Margaretta (1836–93), and Catherine (1838–92) Fox played an essential role in the development of Modern Spiritualism. The daughters of John and Margaret Fox were residents of Hydesville, New York. In 1848, the family began to hear unexplained rapping sounds. Kate and Maggie conducted channelling sessions to contact the presumed spiritual entity creating the sounds and claimed contact with the spirit of a peddler who was allegedly murdered and buried beneath the house. A skeleton later found in the basement seemed to confirm this. The Fox girls became instant celebrities. They demonstrated their communication with the spirit by using taps and knocks, automatic writing or psychography, and later even voice communication, as the spirit took control of one of the girls. [citation needed]

Sceptics suspected this was deception and fraud, and sister Margaretta eventually confessed to using her toe joints to produce the sound. Although she later recanted this confession, she and her sister, Catherine, were considered discredited and died in poverty. Nonetheless, belief in the ability to communicate with the dead grew rapidly, becoming a religious movement called Spiritualism, which contributed significantly to Kardec's ideas. [citation needed]

Talking boards

After the news of the Fox sisters came to France, people became more interested in what was sometimes termed the "Spiritual Telegraph". Planchette, the precursor of the pencil-less Ouija boards, simplified the writing process, which achieved widespread popularity in America and Europe.

Franz Mesmer

Franz Anton Mesmer (May 23, 1734 – March 5, 1815) discovered what he called magnétisme animal (animal magnetism), which became known as mesmerism. The evolution of Mesmer's ideas and practices led Scottish surgeon James Braid (1795–1860) to develop hypnotism in 1841.

Spiritism incorporated various concepts from Mesmerism, [citation needed] among them faith healing and the energization of water for medicine.

Difference from Spiritualism and Occultism
Spiritism differs from Spiritualism primarily in the fact that it believes in reincarnation. Spiritism was not accepted by UK and US Spiritualists of the day as they were undecided whether or not to agree with the Spiritist view on reincarnation. It also differs from Occultism because the teachings of Spiritism are exoteric, as opposed to esoteric knowledge, which is confined to an inner circle of disciples or initiates. All knowledge in Spiritism is publicly available and is never acquired through some form of initiation or hierarchical ascension.

In What Is Spiritism?, Kardec calls Spiritism a science dedicated to the relationship between incorporeal beings (spirits) and human beings. [citation needed] Thus, some Spiritists see themselves as not adhering to a religion but to a philosophical doctrine with a scientific fulcrum and moral grounds. [citation needed]

Another author in the Spiritualist movement, Sir Arthur Conan Doyle, included a chapter  about Spiritism in his book History of Spiritualism. He states that Spiritism is Spiritualist, but not vice versa. Many Spiritualist works are widely accepted in Spiritism, particularly those of 19th-century physicists William Crookes and Oliver Lodge.

Beliefs

Spiritist Codification

The fundamental doctrine of Spiritism ("the Codification") is defined in five of Allan Kardec's books:

 The Spirits' Book—defines the guidelines of the doctrine, covering concepts such as God, Spirit, Universe, Man, Society, Culture, Morals and Religion;
 The Mediums' Book—makes claims about the mechanics of the spiritual world, such as the processes involved in channelling spirits and techniques to be developed by mediums;
 The Gospel According to Spiritism—comments on the Gospels, highlighting passages that Kardec believed to represent the ethical fundamentals shared by all religious and philosophical systems;
 Heaven and Hell—purports to provide interviews with the spirits of deceased people, intending to establish a correlation between the lives they led and their conditions in the beyond;
 The Genesis According to Spiritism—attempts to reconcile religion and science, dealing with three major conflicts between the two: the origin of the universe (and of life, as a consequence) and the concepts of miracles and premonition.

Kardec also wrote a brief introductory pamphlet (What Is Spiritism?) and was the most frequent contributor to the Spiritist Review. His essays and articles were posthumously collected into the Posthumous Works.

Fundamental principles
As defined in The Spirits' Book, the main principles of spiritism are:
 "God is the Supreme Intelligence-First Cause of all things."
 "God is eternal, immutable, immaterial, unique, all powerful, sovereignly just and good."
 "A spirit is not an abstract, undefined being, only to be conceived of by our thought; it is a real, circumscribed being, which, in certain cases, is appreciable by the senses of sight, hearing, and touch."
 "All Spirits are destined to attain perfection by passing through the different degrees of the spirit-hierarchy. This amelioration is effected by incarnation, which is imposed on some of them as an expiation, and on others as a mission. Material life is a trial which they have to undergo many times until they have attained absolute perfection"
 "A spirit's successive corporeal existences are always progressive, and never retrograde; but the rapidity of our progress depends on the efforts we make to arrive at the perfection."
 "The soul possessed its own individuality before its incarnation; it preserves that individuality after its separation from the body."
 "On its re-entrance into the spirit world, the soul again finds there all those whom it has known upon the earth, and all its former existences eventually come back to its memory, with the remembrance of all the good and of all the evil which it has done in them."
 "Spirits exert an incessant action upon the moral world, and even upon the physical world; they act both upon matter and upon thought, and constitute one of the powers of nature, the efficient cause of many classes of phenomena hitherto unexplained or misinterpreted."
 "Spirits are incessantly in relation with men. The good spirits try to lead us into the right road, sustain us under the trials of life, and aid us to bear them with courage and resignation; the bad ones tempt us to evil: it is a pleasure for them to see us fall, and to make us like themselves."
 "The moral teaching of the higher spirits may be summed up, like that of Christ, in the gospel maxim, 'Do unto others as you would that others should do unto you'; that is to say, do good to all, and wrong no one. This principle of action furnishes mankind with a rule of conduct of universal application, from the smallest matters to the greatest."

According to Kardec, the Spiritist moral principles agree with those taught by Jesus. Other individuals such as Francis of Assisi, Paul the Apostle, Buddha and Gandhi have sometimes been considered  by the Spiritists. Spiritist philosophical inquiry concerns with the study of moral aspects in the context of eternal life in spiritual evolution through reincarnation, a process believers hold as revealed by Spirits. Sympathetic research on Spiritism by scientists can be found in the works of Oliver Lodge, William Crookes, William Fletcher Barrett, Albert de Rochas, Emma Bragdon, Alexander Moreira-Almeida and others.

Basic tenets
The five chief points of Spiritism are:

 There is a God, defined as "The Supreme Intelligence and Primary Cause of Everything".
 There are Spirits, all of whom are created simple and ignorant but own the power to perfect themselves gradually;
 The natural method of this perfection process is reincarnation, through which the Spirit faces countless different situations, problems and obstacles and needs to learn how to deal with them;
 As part of Nature, Spirits can naturally communicate with living people, as well as interfere in their lives;
 Many planets in the universe are inhabited.

The central tenet of Spiritism is the belief in spiritual life. From this perspective, the spirit is eternal, and evolves through a series of incarnations in the material world.

Mediumship

Spiritists assert that communication between the spiritual and material worlds happens simultaneously, to varying degrees. They believe that some people barely sense what the spirits tell them in an entirely instinctive way and are unaware of their influence. In contrast, they think mediums have highly developed natural abilities and can communicate with spirits and interact with them visually or audibly or through writing (known by Spiritists as psychography or automatic writing).

Spiritist practice

Kardec's works do not establish any rituals or formal practices. Instead, the doctrine suggests that followers adhere to principles common to all religions.

Meetings

The most important types of practices within Spiritism are:

 Lectures- public lectures are held weekly in most centres, presenting notions of spiritism to a broader audience.
Study groups- with a regular weekly schedule, usually in evenings and small groups. They involve a prayer followed by reading books covering a wide range of topics related to the doctrine; elements of the philosophy are discussed and further explained by a facilitator.
Mediumistic reunions- private, regular weekly meetings reserved for a team of individuals with substantial knowledge of the doctrine who voluntarily give their time to help both incarnated and disincarnated spirits in need; the presence of unprepared individuals is considered hazardous and is thus not recommended.
Gospel at home- A brief meetings usually between family members to pray and read commentary literature related to the New Testament.
Youth and children's meetings- once a week, usually on Saturday afternoons or Sunday mornings; the Spiritist equivalent to Protestant Christian Sunday schools; 
 Healing; - healing sessions often take the form of small group prayer and reading of a passage of relevant literature, followed by a laying on of hands and a prayer. Healing is mainly recommended for individuals who seek help and support for personal reasons. An initial and private meeting is usually held with the centre's workers to listen to the person and give moral support and advice based on the doctrine. Mediumistic phenomena are not considered appropriate in these meetings.
 Conferences-Some lectures are held annually at more extensive seminars, in theatres or convention centres, often given by guest speakers; these events constitute the only occurrences where payment is required for attendance to cover infrastructure fees.
 Spiritist week and book fairs.

Organization

Spiritist associations have various degrees of formality, with some groups having a local, regional, national or international scope. Local organizations are usually called Spiritist centres or Spiritist societies. Regional and national organizations are called federations, such as the Federação Espírita Brasileira and the Federación Espírita Española; international organizations are called unions. Spiritism formally discourages the involvement of financial transactions within spiritist centres and state or national federations; the only means of income allowed are the sale of related books and the voluntary contributions of active members. Spiritist centres are thus non-profit organizations; all studies, lectures, healing sessions and mediumistic activities are offered free of charge.

For many of its followers, the description of Spiritism is three-fold: science, for its studies on the mechanisms of mediumship; philosophy, for its theories on the origin, meaning and importance of life; and religion, for its guidance on Christian behaviour which will bring spiritual and moral evolution to mankind. Some followers do not consider spirituality a religion because it does not endorse formal adoration and requires regular frequency or standard membership. However, the mainstream scientific community does not accept Spiritism as scientific, and its belief system fits within the definition of religion.

Geographic distribution

Spiritism has adherents in many countries, including Canada, Britain, France, Germany, Jamaica, Japan, Portugal, Spain, United States, and particularly in Latin American countries such as Argentina, Uruguay, Cuba, Puerto Rico, and Brazil, which has the most significant proportion and a most significant number of followers. The largest Spiritist group in Asia are the Vietnamese followers of Cao Đài or Caodaists, who formed a new religion building on the legacy of Allan Kardec in 1926 in Saigon and Tây Ninh in what was then French Indochina.

The movement has become widely accepted in Brazil due to Chico Xavier's works. There, the number of self-identified Spiritists accounts for 3.8 million, according to the 2010 national census. However, some elements of Spiritism are more broadly accepted and practised in various ways by at least three times as many people across the country when the estimates include syncretism. According to the Brazilian Spiritist Federation, around 30 million sympathizers (especially among Catholics) attend Spiritist study sessions and practices, Brazilian National census institute IBGE shows that 3,848,876 nationals identified as spiritists in 2012.

In the Philippines, the Union Espiritista Cristiana de Filipinas, Incorporada (Union of Christian Spiritists in the Philippines, Inc.) was founded at the turn of the 1900s and registered with the Securities and Exchange Commission in 1905. The religious organization, which uses human mediums to communicate with spirits that have already attained purity or divinity for moral and spiritual guidance, has tens of thousands of members and worship centres in many parts of the country, mainly in Northern Luzon, Central Luzon and the National Capital Region. Its motto: "Towards God through wisdom and love." Its doctrine: "Without charity (good deed), there is no possible salvation." It uses the Holy Bible as the basis of its teachings, supplemented by messages from divine spirits.

In Spain, one of the great pioneers of Spiritism was Luis Francisco Benítez de Lugo y Benítez de Lugo, VIII Marquis of Florida and X Lord of Algarrobo y Bormujos, who made a presentation of a bill for the official teaching of Spiritism, reading it on August 26, 1873.

Criticisms

Before World War I

Since its early development, Spiritism has attracted criticism. Kardec's introductory book on Spiritism, What is Spiritism?, published only two years after The Spirits' Book, includes a hypothetical discussion between him and three idealized critics, "The Critic", "The Skeptic", and "The Priest", summing up much of the criticism Spiritism has received. The broad areas of criticism relate to charlatanism, pseudoscience, heresy, witchcraft, and Satanism. Until his death, Kardec addressed these issues in various books and his periodical, the Revue Spirite.

Later, a new source of criticism came from Occultist movements such as the Theosophical Society, a competing new religion, which saw the Spiritist explanations as too simple or even naïve.

Interwar period

During the interwar period, a new form of criticism of Spiritism developed. René Guénon's influential book The Spiritist Fallacy criticized both the more general concepts of Spiritualism, which he considered to be a superficial mix of moralism and spiritual materialism, as well as Spiritism's specific contributions, such as its belief in what he saw as a post-Cartesian, modernist concept of reincarnation distinct from and opposed to its two western predecessors, metempsychosis and transmigration.

Post–World War II
The Catechism of the Catholic Church (paragraph 2117) states that "Spiritism often implies divination or magical practices; the Church, for her part, warns the faithful against it".

In Brazil, Catholic priests Carlos Kloppenburg and Óscar González-Quevedo, among others, have written extensively against Spiritism from both a doctrinal and parapsychological perspective. Quevedo, in particular, has sought to show that Spiritism's claims of being a science are invalid. In addition to writing books on the subject, he has also hosted television programs debunking supposed paranormal phenomena, most recently in a series that ran in 2000 on Globo's news program Fantástico.  Brazilian Spiritist Hernani Guimarães Andrade has, in turn, written rebuttals to these criticisms.

Scientific sceptics also frequently target Spiritism in books, media appearances, and online forums, identifying it as a pseudoscience.

Chico Xavier

Chico Xavier (April 2, 1910 – June 30, 2002) was a popular Spiritist medium and philanthropist in Brazil's Spiritist movement who wrote more than 490 books and over 10,000 letters to family members of deceased people, ostensibly using psychography. His books sold millions of copies, all with their proceeds donated to charity. They purportedly included poetry, novels, and even scientific treatises, some of which Brazilian Spiritist followers consider fundamental for comprehending the practical and theoretical aspects of Allan Kardec's doctrine. One of his most famous books, The Astral City, details one experience after death. The book became a movie in 2010, available in multiple languages. Over 15 other movies about Spiritism or Xavier have also been released.

In popular culture
The following works contain concepts related to Spiritist beliefs:

Films
 Chico Xavier, Brazilian film, casting Nelson Xavier and Ângelo Antônio. A box office success in Brazil, it follows the story of Brazilian medium Chico Xavier.
 Nosso Lar (literally "Our Home", but distributed under the title Astral City: A Spiritual Journey internationally) is a 2010 Brazilian film directed by Wagner de Assis, based on the novel of the same name by Chico Xavier about spiritual life after death.
 Kardec is a 2019 Brazilian biographical drama film that follows the story of Allan Kardec, from his days as an educator to his contribution to the spiritist codification.

Soap operas
In Brazil, several soap operas have plots incorporating Spiritism.

 "A Viagem" (The Journey), produced in 1976–77 by Tupi TV, involves mediumship, death, obsession, reincarnation, etc. Globo TV remade it in 1994. [citation needed]
 "Alma Gêmea" (Soulmate), produced in 2005–06 by Rede Globo, tells of a woman who dies and is reborn to find her soulmate again. [citation needed]
 "O Profeta" (The Prophet), produced in 1977–78 by Tupi TV and remade by Globo TV (2006–07), included spiritism as one of the philosophies trying to explain the main character's gifts, including being able to predict the future. [citation needed]
 "Duas Caras" (Two-Face), aired by Rede Globo in 2007-8, includes Ezekiel, a born-again Christian challenged by manifestations of his mediumship.
 "Escrito nas Estrelas" (Written in the Stars), ongoing as of July 2010, includes various Spiritist themes, including reincarnation, spirit evolution, and mediumship. [citation needed]
 "Além do Tempo" (Beyond Time), ongoing as of October 2015, also includes many Spiritist themes, including a second phase in which the characters reincarnate to show the constant fights between them, and also that in future incarnations, their social class changes, being that low-class characters come back as rich people and vice versa.

See also 
Automatic writing
Dowsing
Mediumship
Ouija
Spiritualism

References

External links

For a list of writings by Allan Kardec see his biographic article.

 U.S. Spiritist Federation
 British Union of Spiritist Societies

 
New religious movements